West Kelowna Mall may refer to:

 Okanagan Lake Shopping Centre, a shopping mall located in West Kelowna, British Columbia, Canada
 Westbank Shopping Centre, a shopping mall that was located in West Kelowna, British Columbia, Canada, with it operating from 1995 to 2004